Burton Yost Berry (August 31, 1901 – August 22, 1985) was an American diplomat and art collector.

Born in Fowler, Indiana, Berry studied at Indiana University.  In 1928 he joined the United States Foreign Service. Berry served as Vice-Consul to Istanbul from 1929 to 1931, Consul to Athens in 1938, Istanbul 1943, Bucharest in 1944, Director of the State Department's Office of African, South Asian and Near East Affairs in 1947, Budapest in 1948, and as Ambassador to Iraq from 1952 to 1954.  He then retired, and lived in Istanbul, Beirut, Cairo and finally in Zürich.

Early on in his career, Berry began to collect Middle Eastern textiles coins, gems, jewelry and other antiques. The textiles collection was donated to the Art Institute of Chicago. Many of the coins were donated to the American Numismatic Society.  Much of the rest were donated to the Indiana University Art Museum.

Footnotes

References

1901 births
1985 deaths
People from Fowler, Indiana
People from Zürich
Indiana University alumni
University of Paris alumni
Ambassadors of the United States to Iraq
American expatriates in France
United States Foreign Service personnel